Great Meadows is a railroad station located in the Great Meadows section of Liberty Township, Warren County, New Jersey, United States. The station was built in 1882 by the Lehigh and Hudson River Railway, and added to the National Register of Historic Places on March 23, 1989.

See also
National Register of Historic Places listings in Warren County, New Jersey
Operating Passenger Railroad Stations Thematic Resource (New Jersey)

References

Liberty Township, New Jersey
Queen Anne architecture in New Jersey
Railway stations in the United States opened in 1882
Railway stations in Warren County, New Jersey
Railway stations on the National Register of Historic Places in New Jersey
Former railway stations in New Jersey
Lehigh and Hudson River Railway
National Register of Historic Places in Warren County, New Jersey
New Jersey Register of Historic Places